Lionel Hervey-Bathurst  (7 July 1849 — 4 May 1908) was an English first-class cricketer and British Army officer.

The son of the cricketer Sir Frederick Hervey-Bathurst, 3rd Baronet and his second wife, Clare Emily Brooke, he was born in July 1849 at Clarendon Park, Wiltshire. Hervey-Bathurst purchased a commission as an ensign into the Rifle Brigade in October 1868, with promotion without purchase to lieutenant following in November 1871. In 1875, he made two appearances in first-class for Hampshire County Cricket Club, both against Kent at Catford and Winchester. He scored 30 runs in his two matches, with a highest score of 14. As a wicket-keeper, he took a catch and a stumping apiece. In the Rifle Brigade, he was promoted to captain in April 1879, with promotion to major following in September 1884.

In 1905, Hervey-Bathurst inherited Gadebridge House from his father-in-law, Sir Astley Paston Paston-Cooper, 3rd Baronet. Following his inheritance, he became known as Lionel Paston-Cooper by royal licence from October 1905. In later life, he was a justice of the peace. Hervey-Bathurst died at Hemel Hempstead in May 1908, from complications following an operation for appendicitis. His half brother, Sir Frederick Hervey-Bathurst, 4th Baronet, was also a first-class cricketer.

References

External links
 

1849 births
1908 deaths
Younger sons of baronets
People from Wiltshire
English cricketers
Hampshire cricketers
Rifle Brigade officers
English justices of the peace
Deaths from appendicitis